Ngerukewid or Ngerukeuid (also known as Orukuizu) is a set of islands located inside the Palau's lagoon. The set contains 37 small raised coral islands, which range in size from 0.1 to 48.5 ha, and amount to total land area of 87.3 ha. The islands and the area around them are protected under the Ngerukewid Islands Wildlife Preserve, which was established in 1956.

See also
Rock Islands

References

Uninhabited islands of Palau